Mohamed Jumayyil is a Maldivian actor. He is the son of actor Ahmed Nimal

Early life
Mohamed Jumayyil's father Ahmed Nimal is one of the established actor and director of the industry. Jumayyil went to Ahmadiyya Pre-school as his first institution. He completed his primary education at Jamaluddin School before completing his secondary education at Dharumavantha School. After completing his GCE Ordinary Level exams, Nimal, inclined Jumayyil to persuade a career in film industry. He then offered a chance to act in one of his directed films due to his interest for acting in films. During the time, he was a football player at B.G. Sports Club. He also worked at Singapore Airlines Cargo, before shifting his job and working as an Airport check-in staff.

Career
In 2014, Jumayyil made his film debut with Ahmed Nimal's Aniyaa, alongside Niuma Mohamed, Ismail Rasheed and Fathimath Fareela. Due to some struggle caused during the screening of the film, it failed to garner enough hype to the film. Despite doing average business, Jumayyil's character was met with mixed to positive response from critics. The following year, Jumayyil appeared in Ali Shifau-directed romantic film Emme Fahu Vindha Jehendhen opposite Mariyam Majudha, where he portrayed the role of Ryan. The film along with Jumayyil's acting was critically acclaimed. In a pre-premiere review from Vaguthu, Ismail Nail praised Jumayyil and Majudha's chemistry in the film and mentioned how he has improved compared to his work in Aniyaa. The film was the highest-grossing film of the year, and was a commercial success.

Jumayyil was next featured in Ali Shifau-directed romantic comedy Vaashey Mashaa Ekee (2016) opposite Majudha. In the film, he played the role of Ziyad, a person with a very different taste of his partner. His performance was positively mentioned in the reviews, Ahmed Nadheem from Avas picked Jumayyil as the only actor who has shown a major improvement in acting compared to his previous works. He further rated Jumayyil at the same level of Majudha—whom Nadheem considered as the best actor of the film. The film emerged as one of the highest-grossing films of the year. At the 8th Gaumee Film Awards Jumayyil was bestowed with Best Actor award for Vaashey Mashaa Ekee while being nominated for Emme Fahu Vindha Jehendhen in the same category. He also received the Best Male Debut award for his performance in Aniyaa.

Jumayyil's another release of the year came with Fathimath Nahula's horror film 4426, where he portrayed the role of Suja, a member of the friends who gets trapped in a haunted house. Upon release, the film received mostly positive reviews from critics. Ahmed Nadheem of Avas labelled the film as a "masterpiece" but he found Jumayyil to be "average" performing in the role. With twenty-five back-to-back housefull shows being screened, 4426 was declared as the highest-grossing film of the year.

Jumayyil's first release of 2017 came in the Ali Musthafa-directed Malikaa which did not do well in the box office. He next featured alongside Mariyam Azza in a romantic comedy film Mee Loaybakee which was directed by Ali Shifau. The film emerged as one of the highest-grossing films of 2017. The following year, he was featured in Shifau's family drama Vakin Loabin (2018), marking his second collaboration with Nuzuhath Shuaib and his third collaboration with Majudha. The film tells a story of a young couple's divorce and its impact on everyone involved. Upon release, the film met with positive response from critics—specifically praising the screenplay for toning down its melodrama and breaking from the stereotypes of its genre—and was a commercial success. In a pre-premier review from Raajje.mv, Ismail Naail Nasheed favored the character development and minimised use of melodrama in the film while praising Jumayyil's acting versatility and showcasing a range of emotions through his performance.

Jumayyil's first release of 2019 was the Ahmed Sinan-directed crime thriller Goh Raalhu (2019) which centers around the criminality and misdemeanor a young man has to deal with while trying to prove his truest intention of love. Upon release, the film received widespread positive reviews from critics; Aminath Luba of Sun called it a "five-star worthy blockbuster film" and wrote: "Jumayyil yet again proved that he is here to stay and entertain the audience with his authentic performance, no matter what the genre is". Stereotyped in a romantic avatar, several reviews and comments suggest that Jumayyil is more preferable in the crime related roles. Later during the year, the first Maldivian anthology film was released which featured Jumayyil as a drug dealer in the segment directed by Ravee Farooq, titled Gaathil. The project was shot in 2013 and digitally released six years later due to several delays in post-production.

Media image
In 2018, he was ranked in the ninth position from Dho?'s list of Top Ten Actor of Maldives.

Controversy
In December 2016, Jumayyil was under investigation on allegations of raping two of his female relatives. The Prosecutor General's Office revealed that charges of sexual assault were not pressed against him as a result of insufficient evidence. Allegations regarding the sexual abuse resurfaced in July 2020 after one of the victim, aged 17 at the time of the abuse, publicly shared a detailed account of the harassment. As a result, production company Dark Rain Entertainment removed him from all pending projects.

On 18 December 2017, a case was filed against Jumayyil at Criminal Court for keeping pornographic material on his phone. Three months later, he was charged with possession of pornography, however, was freed on bail when summoned to court for a remand hearing. In January 2018, Jumayyil was arrested from a cafe in Malé on suspicion of consuming and possessing alcohol.

Filmography

Feature film

Television and web series

Discography

Accolades

References

External links
 

Living people
People from Malé
21st-century Maldivian male actors
Maldivian male film actors
Year of birth missing (living people)